Hernán Claret Alemán Pérez (21 May 1955 – 7 July 2020) was a Venezuelan politician who served on the National Assembly representing the state of Zulia. Alemán was a member of the Acción Democrática (AD) political party.

Background 
Hernán Alemán was born on 21 May 1955.

Political career 
Hernán Alemán served as the mayor of the municipio of Cabimas from 1989 to 1996, and again from 2000 to 2008.

Alemán was initially elected as a deputy to represent the 10th circuit of the state of Zulia for the 2011 to 2015 period. Alemán was reelected for the period spanning 2016 to 2021 by the opposition coalition of the Mesa de la Unidad Democrática. Alemán was a politician in exile who lived in Colombia.

Operation Gideon 
In May 2020, Alemán gave several interviews in which he stated that he was involved in the planning of what became Operation Gideon on 3 to 4 May 2020. Alemán went as far as saying that he visited the training camps in the Colombian Guajira. Alemán further indicated he had a great relationship with Jordan Goudreau, the founder of the private military company Silvercorp, which employed Luke Denman and Airan Berry as security contractors, both of whom were detained on 4 May in the course of the failed attempt to raid Caracas by sea. Alemán described Jordan Goudreau as "an extraordinary man, a friend, with extraordinary skills".

Death 
He died in Colombia on 7 July 2020, at 65 years old due to COVID-19 complications during the COVID-19 pandemic in Colombia.

References 

1955 births
2020 deaths
Mayors of places in Venezuela
Venezuelan dissidents
Deaths from the COVID-19 pandemic in Colombia